Foinikas Syros (Greek: Φοίνικας Σύρου) is a professional Greek volleyball club based in the island of Syros. Foinikas plays in the first division of Greek Volleyball Championship (A1 Ethniki Volleyball) and has won 2 national titles, the Greek League Cup at 2012 and 2021. Their home ground is the Dimitris Vikelas Arena in Ermoupolis, Syros and their colours are blue and red.

History
The club was founded in 1980 and its first home was the Foinikas, village in the southwest of Syros. Since 2000, Foinikas plays continually in national divisions. In season 1999-2000 Foinikas was promoted in fourth division of Volleyleague (Gamma Ethniki). The next season, won the rise in third division (Beta Ethniki). After four years, in season 2004-05 was promoted in second division (A2 Ethniki). In season 2008-09 played for first time in first division. Foinikas remained in first division for two years. In season 2009-10 was relegated but returned the next year. As soon as it returned, won the Greek League Cup. At the same season succeeded one more important accolade. It played in the finals of the championship but was beaten by Iraklis Thessaloniki.

Recent seasons

Honours
Greek Volleyball Championship
Finalist (3): 2011–12, 2015–16, 2020–21
Greek Volleyball League Cup
Winner (2): 2012, 2021
Finalist (2): 2014, 2019
Greek Volleyball Super Cup
Winner (1): 2021

Current squad
2020–2021 roster

Technical and managerial staff

Notable players

(Players are listed in alphabetical order)

Andreas Andreadis
Andreas Frangos
Vasilis Kournetas
Ilias Lappas
Athanasios Maroulis
Athanasios Protopsaltis

Panagiotis Pelekoudas
Nikolaos Smaragdis
Dimitrios Soultanopoulos
Mitar Tzourits
Theodoros Voulkidis

Pedro Azenha
Leonardo Caldeira
Deivid Júnior Costa
Murilo Radke

Boyan Yordanov

Raydel Hierrezuelo

Tomislav Dokić
Nikola Mijailović

Peter Michalovič

Žiga Štern

Sponsorships
Great Sponsors: ONEX Neorion Shipyards, Blue Star Ferries, City Insurance

References

External links
Official website foinikasclub.gr
Club presentation at Hellenic Volleyball League site  /www.volleyleague.gr
Club presentation volleybox.net

Greek volleyball clubs
Syros